Rubus macraei, commonly known as Ākalakala, is a species of Rubus that is endemic to Hawaii.  Although superficially similar to the other Hawaiian species, Rubus hawaiensis, sequence differences of the chloroplast gene ndhF indicate that they are derived from separate colonization events of Hawaii. These data indicate that R. macraei is more distantly related to both Asian and North American species of subgenus Idaeobatus than R. hawaiensis. R. macraei usually has a creeping rather than erect or sprawling habit.

References

External links 

 Hawaiian Native Plant Genera - Rubus Photographs of R. macraei.

macraei
Plants described in 1854
Endemic flora of Hawaii
Flora without expected TNC conservation status